Cypremort Point State Park is a public recreation area located on Vermilion Bay, Louisiana near the end of La. Hwy. 319. It is named for nearby Cypremort Point. Cypremort means "dead cypress" in French. The  park, set against a backdrop of coastal marsh, contains a half-mile stretch of man-made beach which contains picnic sites, a fishing pavilion and sailboat launch. Also, there are 6 cabins on the park grounds which may be reserved by guests. Chitimacha tradition says that one of 4 markers for their tribal land was a great cypress, at present-day Cypremort Point State Park. Cypremort Point is one of the few spots on the Louisiana Gulf coastline which may be accessed by road.

Water Activities
The park has a  fishing pier. Crabbing, water skiing, windsurfing and sailing are common activities.

Fauna
A visitor may see nutria, muskrat, alligator, or a number of bird species. Deer, black bear, rabbits, possum, and red fox also make their home in the area.

Gallery

References

External links

Cypremort Point State Park - Louisiana Office of State Parks

Protected areas of Iberia Parish, Louisiana
State parks of Louisiana
Protected areas of St. Mary Parish, Louisiana